Die Aktuelle is a German language weekly women's magazine published in Essen, Germany.

History and profile
Die Aktuelle has been published since 1979. The magazine is part of Funke Mediengruppe. It is published by Gong Verlag on a weekly basis. Its former editorial office was in Nurnberg. The magazine is headquartered in Essen. The chief editor is Anne Hoffmann.

In 2010 the circulation of Die Aktuelle was 388,275 copies. During the second quarter of 2016 it was 353,958 copies.

See also
 List of magazines in Germany

References

External links

1979 establishments in West Germany
German-language magazines
Magazines established in 1979
Mass media in Nuremberg
Mass media in Essen
Weekly magazines published in Germany
Women's magazines published in Germany